Elmari Wilhelm Bowman (March 19, 1897 – December 17, 1985) was a Major League Baseball player for the Washington Senators in August 1920.  The 23-year-old rookie made two pinch-hitting appearances for the Senators and did not play in the field, so his position is not known.

Both of Bowman's appearances took place on the road.  His major league debut on August 3, 1920 was against the Cleveland Indians at League Park.  His second and last appearance, six days later, was against the Chicago White Sox at Comiskey Park.  Bowman was 0-for-1 with a walk in his two games, giving him an on-base percentage of .500.  He also scored one run.

Bowman died in Los Angeles at the age of 88.

External links
Baseball Reference
Retrosheet

1897 births
1985 deaths
Washington Senators (1901–1960) players
Major League Baseball first basemen
Baseball players from Vermont
Jersey City Skeeters players
Toronto Maple Leafs (International League) players
Reading Marines players
Minneapolis Millers (baseball) players
Norfolk Tars players
Shreveport Gassers players
New Haven Indians players
New Haven Profs players
Seattle Indians players
Birmingham Barons players
Springfield Ponies players
Vermont Catamounts baseball players